Diurnal ("daily") may refer to:

General
 Diurnal cycle, any pattern that recurs daily
 Diurnality, the behavior of animals and plants that are active in the daytime
 Diurnal phase shift, a phase shift of electromagnetic signals
 Diurnal temperature variation, a cycle of daily temperature change

Astronomy
 Diurnal arc, the time (expressed in right ascension) that it takes a planet etc. to move from its rising to its setting point
 Diurnal motion, the apparent motion of stars around the Earth

Astrology
 Diurnal chart, a chart for a given date, based on the natal chart
 Diurnal planet, a planet in a sect for which the Sun is above the horizon
 Diurnal sign, a sign in the zodiac

See also
 Diurnality
Salisbury Diurnal